Girsh Blumberg is an Estonian-American experimental physicist working in the field of experimental condensed matter physics, spectroscopy, nano-optics, and plasmonics. 
Blumberg is an elected fellow of the American Physical Society 
,
an elected fellow of the American Association for the Advancement of Science (FAAAS)
,
and a Distinguished Professor of Physics at Rutgers University.

Girsh Blumberg is best known for his contribution to electronic Raman scattering studies in strongly correlated electron systems,
superconductors and quantum spin systems.
He has co-authored over 100 publications and is inventor on over 30 patents in the fields of electronic and optical devices, spectroscopy and nano-plasmonics. 
He and his collaborators made the first observation of the Leggett mode in multiband superconductors,
 
have observed Wigner crystallization in strongly interacting quantum spin ladder systems,

have explained long-standing puzzle of the “Hidden Order” in URu2Si2 heavy fermion compound,

 
have made a discovery of the chiral spin waves on the surface of topological insulators,
 
to name a few.

Biography
Girsh Blumberg was raised in Viljandi, Estonia of educator parents, along with his two sisters Riina and Liia.

Blumberg graduated from secondary school in 1976 with gold medal and then, in 1981, with M.Sc. cum laude from University of Tartu.
He completed his Ph.D. in Physics and Mathematics from Physics Institute of the Estonian Academy of Sciences in 1987.
 
Starting from 1981 he was first a research, and later a senior research scientist at the National Institute of Chemical Physics and Biophysics in Tallinn, Estonia.
Between 1992 and 1998 Blumberg was Visiting Research Assistant Professor of the NSF Science and Technology Center for Superconductivity (NSF-STCS) at the University of Illinois at Urbana-Champaign. 
In 1998 he joined Bell Labs before joining the faculty at Rutgers University in 2008.

References

21st-century American physicists
Fellows of the American Physical Society
Fellows of the American Association for the Advancement of Science
Living people
Experimental physicists
Optical physicists
Scientists at Bell Labs
Rutgers University faculty
1959 births
University of Tartu alumni
People from Viljandi
People from Highland Park, New Jersey